is a prestigious shopping centre near the Murasaki river and Kokura Castle in Kokura Kita ward, Kitakyushu, Japan. It was opened as part of the Kitakyushu Renaissance policy on April 19, 2003. It includes theatres, restaurants, a multiplex cinema, NHK studios, the head offices of Zenrin Co. and the Asahi Shimbun (West area), and a branch of the Kitakyushu city art museum.

Design
The design is composed of five contrasting geometrical shapes in five colours (yellow, red, white, brown and black) to break the massive complex into acceptable proportions.

Map museum

On the 14th floor of the Zenrin-Asahi Shinbun building is the Zenrin map museum. The entrance fee 100 yen. It is open on weekdays, 10.00-17.00.

Second stage
The next stage is the construction of the new 11-story Kokura campus of Nishinippon Institute of Technology which will contain the design faculty, and a four-story Toyota Lexus showroom.

See also
Kokura prefectural office
Milwaukee Riverwalk in the United States

Jon Jerde-associated architectural projects in Japan:
Canal City Hakata (Fukuoka)
Namba Parks (Osaka)
Roppongi Hills (Tokyo)

External sources
 Riverwalk on Nihon Sekkei website
 Riverwalk on the Jerde Partnership website
 Riverwalk Kitakyushu official page

Buildings and structures in Kitakyushu
Tourist attractions in Kitakyushu